César Martins de Oliveira, (born April 13, 1956), simply known as César, is a former Brazilian football forward, who played in several Série A clubs. He was the top goalscorer of the Série A 1979.

Career
Born in São João da Barra, state of Rio de Janeiro, César defended América of his native city from 1976 to 1979, scoring Série A 22 goals in 71 games, and finishing as the Série A 1979 top goalscorer with 12 goals, tied with Cruzeiro's Roberto César. He played for Grêmio in 1983 and in 1984, scoring three goals in 13 Série A games. Defending Grêmio, he won the Copa Libertadores in 1983, and that season's Intercontinental Cup. He scored Grêmio's winning goal against Peñarol in the second leg of the Copa Libertadores final, played at Estádio Olímpico Monumental. Besides América and Grêmio, César has also played for Benfica of Portugal, Palmeiras, São Bento and Pelotas.

Honors

Club
Grêmio
Copa Libertadores: 1983
Intercontinental Cup: 1983

Benfica
Portuguese League: 1980–81, 1982–83
Portuguese Cup: 1979–80, 1980–81, 1982–83
Supertaça Cândido de Oliveira: 1980

References

External links

1956 births
Living people
Footballers from Rio de Janeiro (city)
Brazilian footballers
America Football Club (RJ) players
S.L. Benfica footballers
Grêmio Foot-Ball Porto Alegrense players
Sociedade Esportiva Palmeiras players
Esporte Clube São Bento players
Primeira Liga players
Brazilian expatriate footballers
Brazilian expatriate sportspeople in Portugal
Expatriate footballers in Portugal
Association football forwards